Mass escapes occur when 5 or more prisoners escape from a prison or prisoner-of-war camp at the same time.

Most mass escapes occur after many months of careful planning and preparation, but seldom achieve complete success as usually the detaining power maximises the effort to find and recapture the escapees.

Below is a list of Mass Escapes known to have taken place from German POW camps during World War II.

Escapees from German detention
World War II prisoners of war held by Germany